The Solucar Complex is a complex in Sanlúcar la Mayor, Spain, used primarily for solar power developments.

The complex includes:
 PS10 Solar Power Plant
 PS20 Solar Power Plant
 Solnova Solar Power Station

Plans

PS10 is the first of a set of solar power generation plants to be constructed in the same area that will total more than 300 MW by 2013. Power generation will be accomplished using a variety of technologies. The first two power plants to be brought into operation at Sanlúcar la Mayor are the PS10, and Sevilla PV, the largest low concentration system photovoltaic plant in Europe.

300 MW:
Completed and is operating:
 PS10 (10 MW)
 PS20 (20 MW)
 Solnova 1 (50 MW)
 Solnova 3 (50 MW)
 Solnova 4 (50 MW)
total: 180 MW.

Three more plants are planned:
 AZ20 (20 MW)
 Solnova 2 (50 MW)
 Solnova 5 (50 MW)
Total 120 MW.

PS20 and AZ20 are twin 20 MWe tower plants based on the same concept as PS10.

See also 
 List of power stations in Spain

References

Links 
 http://www.abengoasolar.com/web/en/nuestras_plantas/plantas_en_operacion/espana/#seccion_1
Geography of the Province of Seville
Solar power in Spain